Robert Oakley may refer to:

Robert B. Oakley (1931–2014), American diplomat
Robert McKeeman Oakley (1871–1927), Australian public servant
Rob Oakley (rugby league) (1999-), Scotland international rugby league footballer